Peter Malota (born Pjetër Malota Lulgjuraj; 4 July 1959 in Lofka, Malësia, Albania) is an Albanian film actor, he is best known for his appearances in films starring Jean-Claude Van Damme. He has over 40 years Tae Kwon Do/Hapkido experience. 

In 1984, Malota made his film debut in a small role in Furious and then played a member of a syndicate gang in the action movie Ninja Turf. In 1991, Malota began to work with Van Damme, playing an assassin with kicking skills with knives in his shoes in Double Impact. In Nowhere to Run, he is seen playing the convict Van Damme tries to free, but is killed. In 1996's The Quest, Malota put his kicking skills to use again playing the Spanish fighter who fights Van Damme in the tournament.

Over the past 26 years, Malotahas worked as a fight/stunt coordinator on 25 films.

Filmography

 1984 Furious as Fighter
 1985 Ninja Turf as Syndicate Gang Member
 1985 Crime Killer as Imbrochim
 1991 Double Impact as Bodyguard With Spurs
 1992 Universal Soldier as Stunt Coordinator
 1993 Nowhere to Run as Prisoner 
 1996 The Quest as Spanish Fighter
 1999 Universal Soldier: The Return as Fight Choreographer (uncredited)
 1999 Desert Heat as Fight Choreographer
 2001 Replicant as Fight Choreographer (uncredited)
 2001 The Order as Amnon 
 2006 Honor as Stunt Coordinator
 2009 The Butterfly Effect 3: Revelations as Assailant In The Park
 2009 All's Faire in Love as Stunt Coordinator 
 2010 Meet Monica Velour as Stunt Coordinator
 2010 Trust as Stunt Coordinator
 2010 Vanishing on 7th Street as Stunt Coordinator
 2010 Secrets In The Walls as Stunt Coordinator
 2011 Another Happy Day as Stunt Coordinator
 2011 Salvation Blvd as Stunt Coordinator
 2011 Smooch as Stunt Coordinator
 2011 This Must Be the Place as Stunt Coordinator
 2012 The Oogieloves In The Big Balloon Adventure as Stunt Coordinator
 2013 Love and Honor as Stunt Coordinator
 2013 Highland Park as Stunt Coordinator 
 2016 The Perfect Weapon as Stunt Coordinator
 2017 Kill 'Em All (directorial debut) as Director 
 The Hunted Man as Director
 2021 Shut Down as Stunt Coordinator
 Chinese Hercules: The Bolo Yeung Story as Himself

External links 
 

21st-century Albanian male actors
Albanian emigrants to the United States
People from Malësi e Madhe
Living people
1958 births
Albanian Roman Catholics
Albanian male film actors
20th-century Albanian male actors